is a Japanese talent agency headquartered in Minato, Tokyo. It was founded in 1950 and manages talents, with a main focus on comedians. The agency has produced numerous well known comedians such as Utchan Nanchan and are considered one of the forefront agencies for comedians.

Notable talents

Groups 

 Utchan Nanchan (Teruyoshi Uchimura, Kiyotaka Nanbara)
 Knights (Nobuyuki Hanawa, Nobuyuki Tsuchiya)
 Sanshiro (Hironobu Komiya, Shuji Aida)
 Par Par (Hoshino Disco, Ainapu)
 Kagaya (Sho Kaga, Soya Kaya)
 Nitche (Keiko Enoue, Kumiko Kondo)

Solo 

 Tetsuro Degawa
 Bakarhythm
 Asako Ito
 Passion Yara
 Eiko Kano
 Shinji Maggy

References

External links 

 Maseki Geinosha website

Talent agencies based in Tokyo
Mass media companies established in 1950
Mass media companies based in Tokyo
Entertainment companies of Japan
1950 establishments in Japan
Japanese talent agencies